Gică is a Romanian diminutive of George or Gheorghe, and may refer to:

Gică Craioveanu, footballer
Gică Hagi, footballer
Gică Petrescu, singer
Gică Popescu, footballer